Psyche Industry Records was the leading alternative, punk and hardcore independent record label in Montreal, Quebec, Canada in the beginning of the 80's. The music label was established in 1984 on Cartier Street by show promoter Dan Webster and Randy Boyd  and released mostly records by Montreal bands, but with many exceptions, some artists who appeared on compilations including Porcelain Forehead and Direct Action (on Primitive Air Raid), as well as most of the artists on It Came from the Pit, and solo releases by Groovy Religion and NoMeansNo.

History

Webster and Boyd started Psyche Industry Records as the Musicians Promotional Assistance Society, putting out the legendary Primitive Air Raid compilation featuring mostly Montreal punk and alternative bands, but also bands from elsewhere in Canada, in 1984. This first release was mostly paid for by a benefit show entitled Freedom 84, which took place on June 16, 1984, at Salle Louis De France on Rue Duluth in Montreal. In 1985, the label released another compilation, which was more alternative, avantguarde and industrial leaning, entitled "Panic, Panic". Psyche Industry also re-released the Asexuals first LP, "Be What You Want", that had been released on First Strike Records in 1984 but was out of print. They released a total of eight LP's in 1985, including records by Montreal legends The Nils, Asexuals, S.C.U.M., Disappointed a Few People and NoMeansNo before folding in 1987.

Boyd went on to be a partner in Cargo Records.

Discography
 
 MPAS 01 - Various - Primitive Air Raid - 1984
 PIR 02 - Various - Panic, Panic - 1985
 PIR 03 - Asexuals - Be what you want - 1985
 PIR 04 - Condition - Mumbo Jumbo - 1985
 PIR 05 - Various - It came from the Pit - 1985
 PIR 06 - The Nils - Sell Out Young! - 1985
 PIR 07 - Asexuals - Contemporary World - 1985
 PIR 08 - S.C.U.M. - Born Too Soon - 1985
 PIR 09 - Various - Ultimatum - 1986
 PIR 010 - Groovy Religion - Thin Gypsy Thief - 1986
 PIR 011 - Disappointed a Few People - Dead in Love - 1986
 PIR 012 - NoMeansNo - Sex Mad - 1986

References

See also 
 List of record labels

Record labels established in 1984
Record labels disestablished in 1987
Canadian independent record labels
Punk record labels
Quebec record labels
Companies based in Montreal
Defunct record labels of Canada